The Laylan River is an endorheic river in western Iran.

It originates in the Zagros Mountains within Mahabad County of West Azerbaijan Province, and flows into the endorheic Lake Urmia in East Azerbaijan Province.

See also

References

Rivers of Iran
Landforms of East Azerbaijan Province
Landforms of West Azerbaijan Province
Mahabad County